The magistrate of Hsinchu County is the chief executive of the government of Hsinchu County. This list includes directly elected magistrates of the county. The incumbent Magistrate is Yang Wen-ke of Kuomintang since 25 December 2018.

Directly elected County Magistrates

Timeline

References

External links 
 Hsinchu County Government 

 
Hsinchu County